This is a list of some of the more notable invasive species in Australia.

Species

Plants

The Australian Weeds Committee maintain a noxious weeds list covering all the states and territories.

 Acacia farnesiana (sweet acacia)
 Ageratina riparia (mistflower)
 Ailanthus altissima (tree of heaven)
 Alternanthera philoxeroides (alligator weed)
 Andropogon virginicus (broomsedge)
 Annona glabra (alligator apple)
 Anredera cordifolia (Madeira vine) 
 Ardisia elliptica (shoebutton Ardisia)
 Arundo donax (giant cane)
 Asparagus aethiopicus (asparagus fern) 
 Berberis thunbergii (Japanese barberry) 
 Brassica tournefortii (African mustard) 
 Bromus rubens (foxtail brome) 
 Chrysanthemoides monilifera (bitou bush) 
 Cinnamomum camphora (camphor laurel) 
 Cryptostegia grandiflora (rubber vine)
 Echium plantagineum (Paterson's curse) 
 Hypericum perforatum (St. John's wort)
 Lantana camara (lantana) 
 Leucanthemum vulgare (ox-eye daisy)
 Opuntia spp. (prickly pear) 
 Solanum mauritianum (wild tobacco)

Animals

Arthropods
 Amphibalanus improvisus (bay barnacle) 
 Carcinus maenas (shore crab)
 Cherax destructor (common yabby)
 Limnoria quadripunctata (gribble)

Insects

 Bemisia tabaci (Silverleaf whitefly)
 Solenopsis invicta (Red imported fire ant)
 Vespula germanica (European wasp)
 Monomorium pharaonis (Pharaoh ant)
 Paratrechina Longicornis (longhorn crazy ant) 
 Anoplolepis gracilipes (yellow crazy ant) 
 Apis cerana (eastern honey bee) 
 Aedes albopictus (tiger mosquito) 
 Aethina tumida (small hive beetle) 
 Aphis spiraecola (green citrus aphid) 
 Bruchophagus roddi (alfalfa seed chalcid) 
 Cerataphis lataniae (palm aphid) 
 Ceratitis capitata (Mediterranean fruit fly) 
 Corythucha ciliata (sycamore lace bug) 
 Diuraphis noxia (Russian wheat aphid) 
 Euwallacea fornicatus (tea shot-hole borer) 
 Forficula auricularia (common earwig) 
 Frankliniella occidentalis (western flower thrips) 
 Hylurgus ligniperda (red-haired pine bark beetle) 
 Idioscopus nitidulus (mango leafhopper) 
 Linepithema humile (Argentine ant) 
 Maconellicoccus hirsutus (hibiscus mealybug) 
 Pheidole megacephala (coastal brown ant) 
 Phylacteophaga froggatti (leafblister sawfly) 
 Pineus pini (pine adelgid) 
 Sitobion miscanthi (Indian grain aphid) 
 Solenopsis geminata (ginger ant)  
 Spodoptera frugiperda (fall armyworm) 
 Spodoptera litura (Oriental leafworm moth) 
 Tapinoma melanocephalum (ghost ant) 
 Tremex fuscicornis (tremex wasp) 
 Trichomyrmex destructor (destructive trailing ant) 
 Vespula vulgaris (common wasp) 
 Wasmannia auropunctata (electric ant) 
 Xanthogaleruca luteola (elm-leaf beetle) 
 Xyleborinus saxesenii (fruit-tree pinhole borer)

Molluscs

 Cernuella virgata (Common white snail)
 Cochlicella acuta (Pointed snail)
 Cochlicella barbara (Small pointed snail) 
 Cornu aspersum (garden snail)
 Deroceras invadens (tramp slug) 
 Deroceras laeve (marsh slug) 
 Magallana gigas (Pacific oyster) 
 Musculista senhousia (Asian mussel) 
 Theba pisana (White garden snail)

Chordates

Fish (Freshwater)
 Acanthogobius flavimanus (yellowfin goby) 
 Astronotus ocellatus (oscar) 
 Carassius auratus (Goldfish)
 Cyprinus carpio (Common carp) 
 Gambusia holbrooki (Gambusia)
 Misgurnus anguillicaudatus (Asian weatherloach)
 Oncorhynchus mykiss (Rainbow trout) 
 Oreochromis spp. (Tilapia)
 Pelmatolapia mariae (spotted tilapia)
 Perca fluviatilis (European perch, redfin perch) 
 Salmo trutta (Brown trout)
 Xiphophorus hellerii (green swordtail)

Reptiles & Amphibians
 Hemidactylus frenatus (House Gecko)
 Rhinella marina (Cane toad)
 Trachemys scripta elegans (red-eared slider)
Lissotriton vulgaris (Smooth newts)

Birds
 Acridotheres tristis (Common myna)
 Columba livia (Domestic pigeon)
 Passer domesticus (House sparrow)
 Spilopelia chinensis (Spotted dove)
 Sturnus vulgaris (Common starling)
 Alauda arvensis (Skylark)
 Turdus merula (Eurasian Blackbird)
 Passer montanus (Eurasian Tree Sparrow)
 Carduelis carduelis (European Goldfinch)
 Chloris chloris (European Greenfinch)
 Gallus gallus (Red junglefowl) 
 Gallus varius (green junglefowl)
 Pavo cristatus (Indian peafowl) 
 Anas platyrhynchos (mallard)
 Spilopelia senegalensis (laughing dove)
 Turdus philomelos (song thrush)

Mammals
 Bos javanicus (Domestic Banteng)
 Bubalus bubalis (Water buffalo)
 Camelus dromedarius (Feral camel)
 Canis lupus familiaris (Wild dogs)
 Capra hircus (Feral goat)
 Cervus elaphus (Red deer)
 Equus asinus (Feral donkey)
 Equus caballus (Feral horse)
 Felis silvestris catus (Feral cat)
 Lepus europaeus (European hare)
 Mus musculus (House mouse)
 Oryctolagus cuniculus cuniculus (Common rabbit)
 Rattus norvegicus (Brown rat)
 Rattus rattus (Black rat)
 Sus scrofa domestica (Razorback)
 Vulpes vulpes (Red fox)
 Funambulus pennantii (Five-lined palm squirrel)
 Axis axis (Chital deer)
Axis porcinus (Hog deer)
 Cervus timorensis (Rusa deer)
 Dama dama (Fallow deer)
Cervus unicolor (Sambar Deer)

Echinoderms
 Asterias amurensis (Northern Pacific seastar)

Fungi and pathogens
 Batrachochytrium dendrobatidis (Frog chytrid fungus)

References

External links

 
Invasive
Invasive species
Australia